The compound 3-nitrobenzyl alcohol is an organic compound with the formula C7H7NO3.

Desorption mass spectrometry matrix
In mass spectrometry this compound is often abbreviated as "3-NBA" or "m-NBA."  It has been used as a liquid matrix for fast atom bombardment and matrix-assisted laser desorption ionization. 
In electrospray ionization 3-NBA is doped into low surface tension spray solvents to increase analyte charging.

References

Primary alcohols
Nitrobenzenes